Ian Pringle is an Australian film director, producer and screenwriter.

Career
Pringle wrote and directed the Australian feature film, Wrong World, which was nominated for the Golden Bear at the 35th Berlin International Film Festival in 1985.

His film The Prisoner of St. Petersburg was screened in the Un Certain Regard section at the 1989 Cannes Film Festival.

Pringle's first feature film was The Plains of Heaven (1982). In 1991 he directed the French-Australian co-production Isabelle Eberhardt, starring Peter O'Toole and Mathilda May. Other film work includes co-producing the controversial neo-Nazi drama Romper Stomper.

As of 2012 Pringle continues to work as a script consultant, lecturer and writer. After a 22-year absence he returned to writing and directing with his 2014 Australian feature film The Legend Maker, which premiered at the 2014 Melbourne International Film Festival.

Select credits

Features
The Plains of Heaven (1982) - director, writer
Wrong World (1985) - director, writer
The Tale of Ruby Rose (1989) - associate producer
Celia (1989) - associate producerThe Prisoner of St Petersburg (1989) - director, writerIsabelle Eberhardt (1991) - director, producerRomper Stomper (1992) - producer
The Legend Maker (2014) - director, writer, producer

ShortsFlights (1977) - director, writerThe Cartographer and the Waiter (1977) - director, writer Wronsky (1979) - director, producer, writerSonglines - Segment: "Romeos" (1989) - directorLover Boy (1989) - associate producer - short feature

DocumentariesBare Is His Back Who Has No Brother (1979) - directorDesiderius Orban (1981) - directorIslomania'' - (1985)  - director, writer

References

External links

Australian film directors
Living people
Year of birth missing (living people)